Molvizarin is a cytotoxic acetogenin derivate with the molecular formula C35H62O7 which has been isolated from the bark of the plant Annona cherimolia. Molvizarin has in vitro activity against tumor cells.

References 

Polyketides
Lactones